Francesco Butteri (born 9 May 1954) is an Italian bobsledder. He competed in the four man event at the 1976 Winter Olympics.

References

External links
 

1954 births
Living people
Italian male bobsledders
Olympic bobsledders of Italy
Bobsledders at the 1976 Winter Olympics
People from Civitanova Marche
Sportspeople from the Province of Macerata